Group C of the 1995 FIFA Women's World Cup took place from 6 to 10 June 1995. The group consisted of Australia, China PR, Denmark and United States.

Standings

Matches
All times listed are local, CEST (UTC+2).

United States vs China PR

Denmark vs Australia

United States vs Denmark
After U.S. goalkeeper Briana Scurry was sent off for handling the ball outside the penalty area in the 88th minute, and with no substitutions remaining, outfielder Mia Hamm took her place in goal.

China PR vs Australia

United States vs Australia

China PR vs Denmark

References

External links
FIFA Women's World Cup Sweden 1995, FIFA.com

1995 FIFA Women's World Cup
Australia at the 1995 FIFA Women's World Cup
China at the 1995 FIFA Women's World Cup
Denmark at the 1995 FIFA Women's World Cup
United States at the 1995 FIFA Women's World Cup